Tak Bai (Malay: Taba) is a district (amphoe) in the southeastern part of Narathiwat province, southern Thailand.

History
When the United Kingdom and Siam (Thailand) signed the Anglo-Siamese Treaty of 1909, they agreed to use the Kolok River (Sungai Golok) near Wat Chonthara Singhe (วัดชลธาราสิงเห) as the boundary between British Malaya and Siam due to the culture and arts inside the temple. Before, the area was part of the Mueang Kelantan.

The district was officially created on 12 August 1909.

On 25 October 2004 at least 85 demonstrators died after a brutal police action in the so-called Tak Bai Incident.

Geography
Neighboring districts are (from the southwest clockwise): Su-ngai Kolok, Su-ngai Padi, Cho-airong, Mueang Narathiwat of Narathiwat Province, and the Gulf of Thailand. To the southeast is the state Kelantan of Malaysia.

The boundary crossing is at Pengkalan Kubur (Malaysia) and Taba (Thailand).

On 1 January falls on the New Year's Day, Tak Bai is the first place in Thailand that receives the sunshine, despite not being the easternmost area in the country. This is because the Earth's axis is tilted during the cold season. Which the sun will rise before Khong Chiam district in Ubon Ratchathani province the location of Pha Taem National Park,  about one minute.

Administration
The district is divided into eight sub-districts (tambons), which are further subdivided into 56 villages (mubans). Tak Bai itself has town (thesaban mueang) status and covers parts of tambon Che He. There are a further eight tambon administrative organizations (TAO).

References

External links
amphoe.com (Thai)

Districts of Narathiwat province
Malaysia–Thailand border crossings